The Cumberland & Westmorland Herald (formerly known as The Penrith Herald, The Appleby and Kirkby Stephen Herald, and The Mid Cumberland and North Westmorland Herald over the years) is a local newspaper in Cumbria, England.

Established in 1860, the Herald is an independent weekly broadsheet newspaper covering a large area of Cumbria, including the towns of Penrith, Appleby-in-Westmorland, Kirkby Stephen, Keswick and Alston mainly corresponding to Eden district and part of Allerdale borough.

The newspaper is published weekly on a Saturday, though some shops in Penrith sell it on a Friday evening, with a circulation of approximately 15,910 copies. Up until 2018 The Herald was printed at the CN Group's works at Carlisle but since CN Group was taken over by Newsquest it is printed in Glasgow.  Since the printing of the paper was transferred to Glasgow the size of the pages is smaller and the births, marriages and deaths section has moved to Page 2.

In April 2013, the paper won "Weekly Newspaper Of the Year", at the National Newspaper Awards, and was congratulated by local MP Tim Farron and David Simpson MP at the House of Commons.

In 2019 the paper hit financial troubles and was placed in the hands of the receivers the paper faced closure and its final issue in early 2020.
The papers title and archives were purchased and the paper continues to be published weeks as part of a small local media group that now owns and online and second paper in the area. 
It's understood changes to the format and a price increase have seen the papers print circulation fall substantially from before the LTD company was put in the hands of the receivers and assets sold.
The Cumberland And Westmorland Herald Ltd company is now in the final stages of the insolvency process with only a small amount of the liabilities settled as of march 2022.

See also
Cumbrian Newspapers Group Ltd v Cumberland & Westmorland Herald Newspaper & Printing Co Ltd [1986] BCLC 286, a famous legal case relating to the newspaper.

References

External links
www.cwherald.com

Newspapers published in Cumbria